The Sound of the Jam is a compilation album and the fifth greatest hits album by the group The Jam, released to mark their twenty-fifth anniversary. It contains a remixed version of 'That's Entertainment', featuring only the guitars and vocals of the demo version; and without the bass, drums and percussion.

There is also a 2-disc version which includes a DVD of 11 videos of The Jam playing.  The second disc is some of their other hits and songs that did not appear on any of their studio albums or were unreleased.

Track listing 
All tracks written by Paul Weller unless noted.

Disc one

Disc two

Charts

Personnel 
 Paul Weller – vocals, lead guitar, bass guitar, keyboards, backing vocals
 Rick Buckler – drums, percussion
 Bruce Foxton – vocals, bass guitar, rhythm guitar, backing vocals
 Steve Brookes – lead guitar (1972–1976)
Additional personnel
 Tracie Young – backing vocals on "Beat Surrender"
 Peter Wilson – piano, drums, keyboards, Hammond organ
 Steve Nichol – trumpet, Hammond organ
 Luke Tunney – trumpet
 Martin Drover – trumpet
 Keith Thomas – saxophone, soprano sax
 Afrodiziak – background vocals
 Russell Henderson – steel drums

References

External links 
 

2002 compilation albums
The Jam albums
Polydor Records compilation albums
Universal Music Group compilation albums